Nizam al-Din Hasan al-Nisaburi, whose full name was Nizam al-Din Hasan ibn Mohammad ibn Hossein Qumi Nishapuri (d. 1328/29) was a Persian Sunni Islamic Shafi'i, Ash'ari scholar, mathematician, astronomer, jurist, Qur'an exegete, and poet.

Family and education
Nizam al-Din Hasan al-Nisaburi, who according to genealogical information provided in his full name—Nizam al-Din Hasan ibn Mohammad ibn Hossein Qumi Nishapuri—had a grandfather from the city of Qom, was born in Nishapur.

Little is known about Nīsābūrī's early life and education. His early education was in the city of Nishapur, but he later moved to Tabriz, the capital of Il-Khanids at the time. 

Nīsābūrī studied under and worked with Qutb al-Din al-Shirazi, who was himself a student of Nasir al-Din Tusi. He was one of the great scientists of Maragheh observatory.

In 1304, Nīsābūrī arrived in Azerbaijan; by 1306 he was in Tabrīz, the largest city in Azerbaijan. 

Nīsābūrī died in 1329/1330, the year he completed his .

Works

Astronomy and mathematics

Nīsābūrī started to write  (("Commentary on the recension of the Almagest") in 1303., a commentary on a work by Nasir al-Din al-Tusi. Together with an explanation al-Tusi's text, Nīsābūrī added his own results and ideas. He included data about the obliquity of the ecliptic and discussed the possibility that the transits of Venus and Mercury across the Sun had been seen.

Nīsābūrī second astronomical work,  ("Uncovering the Truths of the Īlkhānid Astronomical Handbook") was completed in 1308/1309.

 ((), "Elucidation of the Tadhkira") was a commentary on Ṭūsī's  ("Memento on Astronomy") that investigated topics that included alternatives to Ptolemy's model of the cosmos, and ideas to explain that accounted the known variations in the obliquity of the ecliptic.

Nisaburi also wrote a treatise on mathematics.

Religious works
Nīsābūrī's most famous work is his  ("A Commentary on the Wonders of Quran in Exegesis"), also known as ). The work was written to demonstrate the importance of science for religious scholars. The work reflects Nīsābūrī's scientific background, in contrast with Rāzī's bias towards the theologians.

Nīsābūrī's other religious works include:
 ;
 , a work on the topics in al-Manazer by Ibn Haytham;
 ;

See also 
 Fakhr al-Din al-Razi
 Shams al-Din al-Samarqandi

References

Sources
 
 </ref>
  (PDF version)

Further reading 

 Islam and Science: The Intellectual Career of Nizam al-Din al-Nisaburi, Robert Morrison, 2007
 زندگینامه ی ریاضیدانان دوره ی اسلامی از سده ی سوم تا سده ی یازدهم هجری، ابوالقاسم قربانی، چاپ دوم، تهران، 1375 (Biographies of the Mathematicians in the Islamic Period, from 10th to 17th century, Abulqasem Qorbani, Tehran, 1996, 2nd edition)

Asharis
Sunni Sufis
Quranic exegesis scholars
Persian Sunni Muslim scholars of Islam
14th-century Iranian mathematicians
Iranian philosophers
People from Qom
People from Nishapur
Iranian Sunni Muslims
14th-century Muslim scholars of Islam
14th-century Iranian astronomers
Astronomers of the medieval Islamic world